James Ross Island is a large island off the southeast side and near the northeastern extremity of the Antarctic Peninsula, from which it is separated by Prince Gustav Channel. It was charted in October 1903 by the Swedish Antarctic Expedition under Otto Nordenskiöld, who named it for Sir James Clark Ross, the leader of a British expedition to this area in 1842 that discovered and roughly charted a number of points along the eastern side of the island. The style, "James" Ross Island is used to avoid confusion with the more widely known Ross Island in McMurdo Sound.

It is one of several islands around the peninsula known as Graham Land, which is closer to South America than any other part of that continent.

The island was connected to the Antarctic mainland by an ice shelf until 1995, when the ice shelf collapsed, making the Prince Gustav Channel passable for the first time.

Mendel Polar Station, the first Czech Antarctic Base, is located on the island.

Paleontology 
Two dinosaur-bearing formations are present on the island, both from the Upper Cretaceous: the Santa Marta Formation and the Snow Hill Island Formation. These are two of only three known formations to have dinosaur fossils in Antarctica.

The first dinosaur discovered in Antarctica was Antarctopelta oliveroi, a medium-sized ankylosaur found on James Ross Island by Argentinian geologists Eduardo Olivero and Roberto Scasso in 1986. The ankylosaur was not formally named until 2006.

In December 2003, U.S. paleontologist Judd Case from Saint Mary's College of California and U.S. geologist James Martin from the South Dakota School of Mines & Technology discovered the bones of a theropod dinosaur on the island. Nicknamed "Naze" after the northerly Naze Peninsula on which it was found, the Late Cretaceous remains include an upper jaw and teeth, and most of the lower legs and feet. Little information is available, but the shape of the leg and feet indicate it was a runner. In 2019, it was given the name Imperobator antarcticus. It was large, about the size of Utahraptor. It is the second Antarctic theropod discovered, after Cryolophosaurus.

An ornithopod was found in the Snow Hill Island Formation by Argentine paleontologists Rodolfo Aníbal Coria and Juan José Moly in 2008. In 2013, Coria named it Trinisaura santamartaensis.

In 2015, an iguanodontid found in 2002 by Fernando Novas was named Morrosaurus antarcticus by Sebastian Rozadilla, Federico Lisandro Agnolin, Fernando Emilio Novas, Alexis Rolando Aranciaga Mauro, Matthew J. Motta, Juan Manuel Lirio Marcelo and Pablo Isasi. The genus name refers to the site of El Morro on James Ross Island, where the remains of the species were found. The specific name refers to Antarctica.

Named features
James Ross Island features several features named by various surveying and exploration groups.

It was probably first seen by Otto Nordenskiöld in 1903, and was surveyed by the Falkland Islands Dependencies Survey (FIDS) in 1945. During a subsequent visit to this bay by a FIDS party in 1952, there was a discussion as to whether medicinal brandy should be used as treatment for a dog bite. The name arose naturally from this incident.
 Dagger Peak, a rock peak
 Davies Dome, a small ice dome southeast of Stoneley Point.
 Rohss Bay, a bay 11 nautical miles (20 km) wide, between Capes Broms and Obelisk on the southwest side of James Ross Island. It was discovered by the Swedish Antarctic Expedition, 1901–04, under Nordenskjold, and named by him for August and Wilhelm Rohss, patrons of the expedition.
 Sentinel Buttress is a prominent crag containing a volcanic breccia sequence, rising to 535 m east of Palisade Nunatak at the head of Rohss Bay.
 Sharp Valley, a small valley located 1 mile (1.6 km) east-southeast of Stoneley Point on James Ross Island. It was named in 1983 by the United Kingdom Antarctic Place-Names Committee (UK-APC) after Michael C. Sharp, British Antarctic Survey (BAS) field assistant in the area, 1981-82.
 Stoneley Point, a rocky point on the northwest coast of James Ross Island, 4 nautical miles (7 km) west of Brandy Bay. It was named after Robert Stoneley, a FIDS geologist at Hope Bay, by the UK-APC in 1952.

See also 
 Blancmange Hill
 Composite Antarctic Gazetteer
 List of Antarctic islands south of 60° S
 Nygren Point
 Scientific Committee on Antarctic Research
 Skep Point
 Territorial claims in Antarctica
 Whisky Bay

References

 
Islands of Graham Land
Paleontological sites of Antarctica
Islands of the James Ross Island group